The LR7 is a deep-submergence rescue vehicle (DSRV) of the People's Republic of China's People's Liberation Army Navy (PLAN). It was built by Perry Slingsby of Britain and is a development of the LR5 DSRV. The LR7 entered service in 2009.

Development
In 2000 and 2001, Chinese representatives attended international submarine rescue conferences and exercises. This may have followed the 1995 accident suffered by Chinese submarine 361 while surfaced leading to the deaths of the entire crew. China entered negotiations to purchase DSRVs from Britain or Canada which may have resulted in the order for the LR7 through Rolls-Royce Marine.

The LR7 was tested in Loch Linnhe, Scotland, in September 2008. It was delivered and entered service in 2009.

The Type 926 submarine support ship was developed to deploy the LR7. The first was laid down in 2007 and entered service in 2010.

Design
The LR7 may operate at depths of 500 meters and may dock with submarines with their bows 60 degrees up.

The DSRV is has a Scorpio 45 remotely operated underwater vehicle with a 1000 meter umbilical. The ROV is used to locate submarines, clear obstructions from escape hatches, and replenish life support stores.

References

Sources

Deep-submergence rescue vehicles
Submarines of the People's Liberation Army Navy
Lifeboats